Rhizolepas is a genus of crustaceans belonging to the monotypic family Rhizolepadidae.

Species:

Rhizolepas annelidicola 
Rhizolepas gurjanovae

References

Barnacles
Maxillopoda genera